Carl Jackson (born 1953) is an American country and bluegrass musician.

Carl Jackson may also refer to:

 Carl Jackson (caddie), golf caddie at the Augusta National Golf Club
 Carl Jackson (organist) (born 1958), British organist and the Director of Music at the Chapel Royal, Hampton Court
 Carl W. Jackson, member of the Maryland House of Delegates